BMO Field is an outdoor stadium located at Exhibition Place in Toronto, Ontario, Canada, which is home to Toronto FC of Major League Soccer and the Toronto Argonauts of the Canadian Football League. Constructed on the site of the former Exhibition Stadium and first opened in 2007, it is owned by the City of Toronto, and managed by Maple Leaf Sports & Entertainment. The stadium's naming rights are held by the Bank of Montreal, which is commonly branded as "BMO".

BMO Field was originally constructed as a soccer-specific stadium to serve as the home field of the expansion Toronto FC, and hosted matches during the 2007 FIFA U-20 World Cup and 2014 FIFA U-20 Women's World Cup. In 2010, when it was still a neutral-site game, BMO Field hosted the MLS Cup. It has since hosted the 2016 and 2017 finals featuring Toronto FC, under the current practice of giving home field advantage to the side with the better regular season record. The venue has also hosted rugby union, including matches of Canada's national team, and rugby sevens during the 2015 Pan-American Games.

From 2014 to 2016, the stadium underwent a series of major renovations, which added an upper deck to the east grandstand and a roof over the seating areas, and lengthened the field to make it suitable for hosting Canadian football. The latter allowed for the Toronto Argonauts to move to BMO Field beginning with the 2016 CFL season, which also saw the 104th Grey Cup played at the stadium. It is one of two Canadian stadiums which will host matches of the upcoming 2026 FIFA World Cup. An expansion for the tournament will bring the stadium's capacity to 45,736 seats.

Construction
BMO Field is the fifth stadium to be built at its exact location at Exhibition Place. The most recent was Exhibition Stadium, which lost its primary tenants, the Toronto Argonauts of the Canadian Football League and Toronto Blue Jays of Major League Baseball, with the opening in 1989 of the SkyDome (now Rogers Centre). Exhibition Stadium was demolished in 1999.

A number of proposals to build a stadium in Toronto were considered in the 2000s.  The Argonauts submitted a proposal to the city to renovate Lamport Stadium and expand its capacity to 19,000.  In March 2003 the proposal was modified to constructing a new 22,000 seat stadium at Exhibition Place. That July the Canadian Soccer Association (CSA) announced separate plans for a 30,000 seat $82 million stadium at the site, to host the 2007 FIFA U-20 World Cup which it had bid on.  The governments of Canada and Ontario agreed to provide a combined C$35 million in funding for a new stadium if the CSA was successful in acquiring the rights to the tournament. At the time, Maple Leaf Sports & Entertainment (MLSE), owners of the National Hockey League's Toronto Maple Leafs and the National Basketball Association's Toronto Raptors, was also looking for a stadium to host a new Major League Soccer (MLS) team they were considering launching.  The league considered soccer-specific stadiums to be necessary for an expansion franchise to be granted, due to the improved atmosphere and control of revenue streams.

The Argonauts, CSA and MLSE agreed to partner to build a new 25,000-seat, $80 million Varsity Stadium at the University of Toronto.  Aside from the committed government funding, $15 million was to come from the UofT, which would own the stadium, and a $30 million loan would be taken out by the University with the annual $2.1 million financing charges paid by the Argos.  However, MLSE backed out of the stadium due to a lack of financial return, and the deal ultimately fell through in 2004 when the University's new President withdrew his support after its cost rose over $100 million.

Later that year, the Argos and CSA announced plans to build a 25,000-seat, $70 million stadium at York University, which would contribute the land and $15 million, with the Argos adding $20 million to the government funding. MLSE was not involved in this project.  However, the Argos pulled out of the stadium after signing a new 15-year lease at Rogers Centre with significantly reduced rent.

In 2005, the stadium site was moved back to Exhibition Place, on the location of the demolished Exhibition Stadium and then-existing Sports Hall of Fame building, in a partnership between MLSE and the CSA. With a total costs of $62.9 million (all figures are in Canadian dollars) to build the stadium ($72.8 million including the land), financial contributions came from multiple sources.  The Canadian Federal Government contributed $27 million, the Government of Ontario added an additional $8 million, and the City of Toronto paid $9.8 million and contributed the land for the project (valued at $10 million), while retaining ownership of the stadium.  MLSE contributed $8 million towards construction costs and was responsible for any cost overruns.  In return, they got the management rights for the stadium.  MLSE committed to purchase a MLS soccer team to play in the stadium.  The remaining funds came from MLSE, which paid $10 million for the naming rights of the stadium for the duration of the 20-year management agreement, which they later resold to the Bank of Montreal (BMO) for $27 million over the first 10 years.

The proposal approved by the City of Toronto was for a stadium that was "capable of a conversion to a football format."  The Argonauts attempted to join the project at the last minute, but MLSE, citing budget and time limitations, constructed the stadium such that it could not fit a CFL field without demolition and reconstruction of the end zone stands.

The stadium features seats which are entirely red with the exception of a design on each of the main stands. On the east side, the design is a large maple leaf while on the lower west stand the design spells out "TORONTO", and has a portion of the Toronto FC logo. The south stand has "BMO" spelled out.

On May 11, 2006, Major League Soccer announced that Toronto FC would join the league as its 13th (and first Canada-based) team in 2007, with BMO Field serving as its home.

Renovations

BMO Field originally used FieldTurf rather than a natural grass pitch, which attracted some criticism. A temporary grass turf was laid in August 2009 for a friendly against Real Madrid. Prior to the 2010 season Toronto City Council approved MLSE's request to convert the stadium to natural grass. MLSE paid the $3.5 million for the conversion, and promised to cover all additional costs to maintain the surface. A variety of Kentucky Bluegrass was installed in the spring of 2010, along with a state of the art drainage system and heating system in the field. MLSE spent a further $2 million to expand the north end by 1,400 seats for the 2010 season.  As part of the deal to convert the field to natural grass, MLSE spent $1.2 million adding a winter bubble to Lamport Stadium and $800,000 building a new artificial turf field to replace the community use hours lost at BMO. By the end of the 2010 renovation, the total cost came to $5.5 million CAD.

In November 2009, it became public that the Toronto Argonauts were in discussions with the City of Toronto over the possibility of moving from Rogers Centre to BMO Field, potentially as early as the 2010 CFL season. The CFL agreed to study the feasibility of the Argos playing at BMO Field, which was built too short to fit a full length Canadian football field despite the requirement that the stadium be convertible to CFL configuration in the original stadium agreement. According to Tom Anselmi, former executive vice-president and chief operating officer with MLSE, without significant renovations BMO Field could only fit a 100-yard field with 15-yard end zones or a 110-yard field with 10-yard end zones, which is 20 yards shorter than the standard 110-yard field and 20-yard end zones. On December 16, 2009, the Argonauts officially abandoned the idea, after the CFL concluded that the venue was not suitable for Canadian football in its current state.

Anselmi indicated in 2009 that a second level could be added to the east side stands and extra rows added to the south side stands, which would add an additional 8,400 seats, for approximately $15 million.  Following Tim Leiweke taking over as president of MLSE in June 2013, he began discussing the company's plans for a major renovation of the stadium.  In early January 2014, Leiweke said that next six months would be spent consulting with experts to determine the feasibility of the project.

As the stadium is owned by the City of Toronto, their consent is required for any modifications.  The City insisted that any renovations included making the playing surface longer to fit a CFL field so it could house the Argonauts, who had to vacate their current home Rogers Centre by the end of 2017 season.  Mark Grimes, Chairman of Exhibition Place's Board, began negotiating with MLSE on the project and said "I think I have Mr. Leiweke's ear in that I am a big CFL fan and that we need to get the Argos on stable ground."  Deputy Mayor Norm Kelly said that "the Argos have got to play there" and that "I think there is a very good chance that they will."  On February 25 Grimes said that a deal was "getting close" and could be reached "in the next couple weeks".  Preliminary plans were released to the public on March 5.

In addition to making the field compatible for CFL games, the upgrades, which were originally budgeted for $115–120 million, added a new upper deck on the east side, raising capacity from 21,566 seats to 30,000 for soccer, with 26,500 seats in CFL configuration, and is temporarily expandable with additional end zone seating to 40,000 for big events such as the rugby sevens at the 2015 Pan-Am games, NHL outdoor games, Grey Cup, MLS Cup, possible 2028 Summer Olympics or later or a successful 2026 FIFA World Cup by Canada.  The plans called for $30 million retractable end zone seating in the south and a retractable terrace in the north end to ensure that fans aren't farther from the playing surface in soccer configuration due to the longer CFL field, and a roof over most permanent seating areas.  Leiweke promised that soccer playing surface will remain natural grass.  A reinforced hybrid playing surface such as Desso GrassMaster, in which artificial fibres are embedded in the turf to allow for the grass roots to intertwine with them to strengthen the pitch, was originally under consideration, but concerns that this would complicate repairs to the pitch led MLSE to decide against it.  A $1 million subsurface heating system and a $1 million artificial lighting system were installed to encourage grass growth, and MLSE secured an exemption to use pesticides on the field.  Portions of the CFL end zones are artificial turf.  Removable paint is used for lining the field to allow for the football lines to be removed prior to soccer games.  As well, the field has two football goalpost configurations so that the same grass isn't relined every game.  Under a two-phase construction process, the field was lengthened and the capacity of the stadium increased for $77 million by May 1, 2015, with the roof added by May 1, 2016 for $43 million.

Leiweke in the past had said that even without an expansion the stadium needed $30 million in repairs, and that the original agreement called for the city and MLSE to split that bill equally.  Instead, MLSE looked for $10 million in public funding from each of the municipal, provincial, and federal governments to top up their $90 million contribution, plus any cost overruns, for the expansion.  MLSE argued that the new stadium would result in $8 million in economic benefits, including taxes, accruing to the province annually, and $18 million in taxes on the construction project.  The company has agreed to pay a fixed annual rental fee of $865,000 to the City for the upgraded stadium, rather than the variable revenue sharing model under the present agreement which returned an average of $397,000 to the city over the previous five years, to help ensure that the city recoups its investment.  The new arrangement guaranteed the city $25.4 million, and with the projected $6 million in parking revenues the $31 million in revenue over the term of the lease would be $19 million more than under the former agreement.  As manager of the stadium, MLSE gets any profit turned by the stadium, and is responsible for any losses.  MLSE's management and naming rights agreement for the stadium, which was set to expire in 2027, were extended by 10 years under the proposal.  The agreement requires MLSE to reach a "long-term use (i.e. 20 years)" lease with the Argos for usage of the stadium starting in 2015.  The proposed renovations were unanimously approved by the Board of Governors of Exhibition Place on March 7, and the City of Toronto's Executive Committee gave their consent on March 19.  The full City Council approved the deal on April 3, and the agreement is planned to be finalized by June 15.  The Provincial Minister of Tourism and Culture Michael Chan said that MLSE has submitted a funding request and that "we are looking at it", while the Federal Infrastructure Minister Denis Lebel's spokesperson said that "the federal government has no program to fund professional sports facilities".  A spokesperson for Lebel would later say "our government will not fund the BMO Field as long as it is used by a professional sports team".  However, according to Leiweke, the federal funding "is not going to the stadium, their money is going to host big events."  In another interview he said "the feds are giving us the resources to (temporarily) expand to 40,000 for our Grey Cup bids and Winter Classic bids".

By late May 2014, MLSE had not reached a financing agreement with either the federal or provincial governments to fill the $20 million funding gap.  The fall of the government of Ontario, with an election scheduled for June 12, prevented them from approving their share of the funding.  With deadlines approaching to start construction to ensure that the stadium was ready for the 2015 Pan-Am games, MLSE decided to move forward with the first phase of the renovation without first securing further funding commitments from the government.  The revised plan proposed a $65 million addition of an upper east deck in the first phase, and $40 million addition of a canopy in the second phase.  The lengthening of the field to make it CFL compatible and the infrastructure to allow for a temporary increase in seating capacity was postponed to a third phase costing $20–$25 million to be completed by May 1, 2017, pending a commitment by the governments or other parties to fund it and a usage agreement being reached with the Argos.  MLSE agreed to pay the city an additional $160,000 annually for as long as phase 3 remains uncompleted to compensate the city for the envisioned parking revenues at Argos games.  Leiweke pledged that if both levels of government funded the project "we're obligated to renovate the stadium for the CFL", but if the necessary conditions for phase three are not met by May 15, 2017, MLSE can pull out.  The new proposal was approved by city council on June 12.  It is thought that if the Liberals win the provincial election they will fund the project.  The official groundbreaking took place on September 23.  In April 2015, it was reported that the renovations were $10 million over budget due to pressure to meet deadlines, which MLSE is obligated to fund.

On May 20, 2015, it was announced that two of the three ownership partners of MLSE, Bell Canada and Larry Tanenbaum's Kilmer Group, had acquired an ownership stake in the Argos, with the deal to close at the end of the year, and would move the team to BMO Field for the 2016 season. The new ownership group for the Argos committed $10 million to the conversion costs for BMO Field, with MLSE matching this to fill the $20 million funding gap.  Part of the agreement would see two Grey Cups played at the newly renovated BMO Field.  The renovations for the Argonauts added a state-of-the-art  dressing room.  In February 2016 it was announced that BMO had extended its naming rights sponsorship agreement for an additional ten years.  The renovation ended up costing $150 million in total.  At the reopening ceremony it was announced that the province of Ontario had contributed $10 million to the financing. After the renovations, the field for configuration for football has only 18 yard end zones (instead of the standard 20 yards) due to space constraints and the necessity of a safety zone for players beyond the field of play.

In April 2019, MLSE converted the field to a hybrid grass surface.

Recent developments
In August 2017, Toronto FC II, which hosted their games at the Ontario Soccer Centre their first three seasons, announced that it would move its home games to BMO Field and Lamport Stadium beginning with the 2018 season.  However, with their drop to the division 3 USL League One for the 2019 season, the team moved their home games to BMO Training Ground.

As part of the NHL's attempt to salvage its season due to the COVID-19 pandemic, BMO Field was used as part of the NHL's bubble in Toronto for the Eastern Confefence teams in the 2020 Stanley Cup playoffs.

BMO Field has been selected as a venue for the 2026 FIFA World Cup. The field will be supplemented by 17,000 temporary seats to bring its capacity to over 45,000 for the event.

History

Soccer

Toronto FC played their first game at BMO Field on April 28, 2007.  The grand opening celebration took place on May 12, 2007. On July 18, 2009, BMO Field had its first alcohol suspension, due to an incident that occurred on May 21, 2008, regarding alcohol consumption by a minor.

The 2008 MLS All-Star Game was held at BMO Field on July 24, 2008 versus West Ham United of the English Premier League.

BMO Field has hosted several MLS Cups, and was the first venue outside of the United States to host the event in 2010, featuring the Colorado Rapids defeating FC Dallas 2–1. The first MLS home playoff game held at BMO Field saw Toronto FC defeat the Philadelphia Union 3–1 on October 26, 2016. BMO Field hosted the MLS Cup again in 2016, as Toronto FC won the MLS Eastern Championship and hosted the Seattle Sounders in the final; Seattle won the match 5–4 on penalties following a goalless draw after extra time.

On December 9, 2017, BMO Field hosted its second consecutive MLS Cup in 2017: a rematch between Toronto FC and the Seattle Sounders from the previous edition. This time, Toronto FC defeated Seattle 2–0, and became the first MLS team to complete a domestic treble with their win, as well as the first Canadian team to win the MLS Cup.

On July 24, 2014, BMO Field hosted the opening match of the 2014 International Champions Cup between Olympiacos and A.C. Milan; Olympiacos won the match 3–0.

2007 FIFA U-20 World Cup

BMO Field hosted the 2007 FIFA U-20 World Cup, the first major tournament held at the stadium. The stadium saw the Canadian Under-20 squad once. The stadium also saw six knockout stage games including the Final; which was won by Argentina. Due to FIFA sponsorship regulations, the venue was referred to as the "National Soccer Stadium" during the event.

2014 FIFA U-20 Women's World Cup
BMO Field hosted the 2014 FIFA U-20 Women's World Cup. Canada played in Toronto for the first two match days, with Korea DPR, Finland, and Ghana in their group. National Soccer Stadium also hosted a quarterfinal match on August 16.

2015 CONCACAF Gold Cup

Campeones Cup

2026 FIFA World Cup
BMO Field is set to host several matches during the 2026 World Cup, making it one of the only two Canadian venues to host matches during the tournament. During the event, the stadium will be temporarily renamed to "Toronto Stadium" in accordance with FIFA's policy on corporate sponsored names.

Notable friendlies
BMO Field has hosted a number of friendly soccer matches.

Canadian football

With the Argonauts moving to the renovated BMO Field beginning with the 2016 season, the team was awarded on October 1, 2015 the right to host the 104th Grey Cup at the stadium on November 27, 2016. On June 11, 2016, the Argonauts played their first game at the stadium, a preseason (exhibition) game; the Argos defeated the Hamilton Tiger-Cats 25–16. On June 23, the Argos played their first regular season game at BMO Field; the Ti-Cats defeated the Argos 42–20.
Due to the position of the stands, each end zone is only 18 yards deep rather than the standard 20 in Canadian football.

Rugby

Rugby union

BMO Field was a home venue for Canada's national rugby union team. From 2011 to 2016, the team has played at the venue regularly.

During the 2015 Pan American Games, BMO Field hosted the rugby sevens competition (soccer events took place at Tim Hortons Field in Hamilton). Due to PASO sponsorship regulations, the venue was referred to as "Exhibition Stadium" during the event.

Lacrosse
In 2009, the Toronto Nationals of Major League Lacrosse began playing their home games at BMO Field. The team moved to Lamport Stadium for 2010 and to Hamilton in 2011 before folding in 2013.

Hockey
On January 1, 2017, BMO Field hosted an NHL outdoor game, the NHL Centennial Classic, in honour of the Toronto Maple Leafs' and the NHL's centennial seasons. The Leafs hosted the Detroit Red Wings, in a rematch of the 2014 NHL Winter Classic held three years prior. The venue was referred to as "Exhibition Stadium" for its duration, as Scotiabank (a direct competitor to BMO), was title sponsor of the event.

Concerts
The only music concert thus far at BMO Field was performed by the progressive rock group Genesis on September 7, 2007.

Milestones

The first goal at BMO Field was scored by Eddie Johnson for the Kansas City Wizards in a 1–0 Major League Soccer win over home side Toronto FC in the stadium opener on April 28, 2007. The first Toronto FC goal at the stadium was Danny Dichio's first-half strike against Chicago Fire on May 12, 2007 (also his club's first MLS goal).

The first goal at BMO Field scored by a Canadian came at the official opening on May 11, 2007, in a U-20 friendly between Canada and Argentina. David Edgar scored a penalty in a 2–1 defeat for Canada, just four minutes after Gómez had scored the first international goal at the stadium.

Costa Rica's Víctor Núñez scored the first senior international goal in a 1–1 friendly draw with hosts Canada on September 12, 2007, shortly before Dwayne De Rosario scored Canada's first senior goal at the stadium.

The first Toronto FC goal scored by a Canadian at BMO Field was in a June 25, 2007 friendly against Aston Villa of the English Premier League. Andrea Lombardo scored an equalizer at BMO Field's south end to make it 2–2 before Aston Villa ran out 4–2 winners. The first league goal at BMO Field scored by a Canadian came when Miguel Cañizalez scored for Toronto FC in the second minute of their 2–1 defeat to the Columbus Crew on September 22, 2007, snapping an 824-minute MLS goalless streak.

The first Toronto FC MLS playoff goal was scored at BMO Field in the 15th minute by Sebastian Giovinco on October 26, 2016 in front of 21,759. In the same game, the first Toronto FC playoff goal scored by a Canadian was by Jonathan Osorio in the 48th minute; the final score was 3–1 over the Philadelphia Union.

In lacrosse, the first MLL goal at BMO Field was scored by Merrick Thomson of the Toronto Nationals in a 15–11 win in their home opener on May 22, 2009.

In Canadian football, the first CFL points scored at BMO Field was a Toronto Argonauts completed touchdown pass caught by Vidal Hazelton, thrown by Logan Kilgore, in a June 11, 2016 exhibition Argos win; final score 25–16. The first CFL regular season points scored at the stadium was a conceded safety touch of 2 points by Canadian Argos kicker/punter Lirim Hajrullahu in a 20–42 loss on June 23. The first regular season points scored by the Argos at BMO Field was a successful field goal kicked by Hajrullahu in the same game. On July 25, the Argonauts won their first regular season game at their new home, defeating the Montreal Alouettes 30–17.

Attendance records
The largest attendance for any event at the stadium was recorded on January 1, 2017, when the Toronto Maple Leafs hosted the Detroit Red Wings in the NHL Centennial Classic in front of 40,148 people.  The largest attendance for a Major League Soccer game was on December 10, 2016, when Toronto FC hosted the Seattle Sounders FC in the 2016 MLS Cup Final in front of 36,045.  The largest attendance for a Canadian Football League game was the 104th Grey Cup played before 33,421 on November 27, 2016. For all three games, which were played within five weeks of each other, the stadium was expanded beyond its permanent capacity.

MLS

CFL

Notes:
1 104th Grey Cup game between the Ottawa Redblacks and Calgary Stampeders.

2 Limited capacity for all regular season games due to COVID-19 pandemic.

Rugby
The largest crowd for rugby at BMO Field and in Canada occurred when the Canada national rugby union team hosted the New Zealand Māori All Blacks before 22,566 people on November 3, 2013. The Maori All Blacks won the match 40–15.

See also

List of Canadian Football League stadiums
List of Major League Soccer stadiums
List of soccer stadiums in Canada
Venues of the 2015 Pan American and Parapan American Games

References

Notes

External links

BMOField.com
Argonauts BMO Field Site
BMO Field Construction Photos
Video Tour of BMO Field
Cathal Kelly. "FC or TFC ... the fans will decide". Toronto Star, April 5, 2007.

Sports venues completed in 2007
Canada
Soccer venues in Canada
Major League Soccer stadiums
Canadian Football League venues
Soccer venues in Ontario
Sports venues in Toronto
Former Major League Lacrosse venues
Multi-purpose stadiums in Canada
Maple Leaf Sports & Entertainment
Toronto FC
Toronto Argonauts
Toronto FC II
Field
Rugby union stadiums in Ontario
Venues of the 2015 Pan American Games
CONCACAF Gold Cup stadiums
2026 FIFA World Cup Stadiums
Exhibition Place
2007 establishments in Ontario
Outdoor ice hockey venues in Canada
Canadian football venues in Ontario